Pycnarmon is a genus of moths of the family Crambidae described by Julius Lederer in 1863.

Species
Pycnarmon abraxalis (Walker, 1866)
Pycnarmon aeriferalis (Moore, 1877)
Pycnarmon albivittalis (Hampson, 1912)
Pycnarmon alboflavalis (Moore, 1888)
Pycnarmon annulalis (Dognin, 1906)
Pycnarmon argenticincta (Hampson, 1899)
Pycnarmon argyria (Butler, 1879)
Pycnarmon aripanalis (Hampson, 1899)
Pycnarmon cecinalis (Dognin, 1897)
Pycnarmon chinensis (South in Leech & South, 1901)
Pycnarmon cribrata (Fabricius, 1794)
Pycnarmon crocalis (Hampson, 1899)
Pycnarmon decipiens Munroe, 1958
Pycnarmon deicoonalis (Walker, 1859)
Pycnarmon diaphana (Cramer, 1777)
Pycnarmon dichocrocidalis (Strand, 1918)
Pycnarmon diffusalis Hampson, 1917
Pycnarmon eosalis Viette, 1958
Pycnarmon fulvomarginalis (Pagenstecher, 1900)
Pycnarmon geminipuncta (Hampson, 1912)
Pycnarmon glaucias (Meyrick, 1894)
Pycnarmon grisealis (Kenrick, 1912)
Pycnarmon idalis (Walker, 1859)
Pycnarmon jaguaralis (Guenée, 1854)
Pycnarmon juanalis 
Pycnarmon lactiferalis (Walker, 1859)
Pycnarmon leucinodialis 
Pycnarmon leucodoce Meyrick, 1936
Pycnarmon levinia (Stoll in Cramer & Stoll, 1781)
Pycnarmon macilentalis Viette, 1958
Pycnarmon macrotis (Meyrick, 1897)
Pycnarmon mallaleuca (Hampson, 1907)
Pycnarmon marginalis (Snellen, 1890)
Pycnarmon meritalis (Walker, 1859)
Pycnarmon mioswari (Kenrick, 1912)
Pycnarmon nebulosalis Hampson, 1896
Pycnarmon obinusalis Walker, 1859
Pycnarmon orophila Ghesquière, 1940
Pycnarmon pantherata Butler, 1878
Pycnarmon peruvialis 
Pycnarmon praeruptalis (Lederer, 1863)
Pycnarmon pseudohesusalis Strand, 1920
Pycnarmon pulchralis (Swinhoe, 1901)
Pycnarmon quinquepuncta (Swinhoe, 1904)
Pycnarmon radiata (Warren, 1896)
Pycnarmon sarumalis (Holland, 1900)
Pycnarmon schematospila (Meyrick, 1937)
Pycnarmon sciophila Ghesquière, 1940
Pycnarmon sericea Ghesquière, 1940
Pycnarmon septemnotata (Mabille, 1900)
Pycnarmon sexpunctalis (Hampson, 1912)
Pycnarmon staminalis (Hampson, 1912)
Pycnarmon subpictalis (Hampson, 1912)
Pycnarmon syleptalis (Hampson, 1899)
Pycnarmon tapeina Ghesquière, 1940
Pycnarmon virgatalis Moore, 1867

Former species
Pycnarmon dialithalis Hampson, 1917
Pycnarmon discinotalis Moore, 1877
Pycnarmon vohilavalis (Viette, 1954)

References

Spilomelinae
Crambidae genera
Taxa named by Julius Lederer